The 1997 Miami Hurricanes baseball team represented the University of Miami in the 1997 NCAA Division I baseball season. The Hurricanes played their home games at Mark Light Field. The team was coached by Jim Morris in his fourth season at Miami.

The Hurricanes reached the College World Series, where they finished tied for third after recording an opening round win against UCLA and a second round win over top-seeded and eventual runner-up Alabama and a pair of semifinal losses to Alabama.

Personnel

Roster

Coaches

Schedule and results

References

Miami Hurricanes baseball seasons
Miami Hurricanes
College World Series seasons
Miami
Miami Hurricanes baseball